The Galway–Kerry rivalry is a Gaelic football rivalry between Irish county teams Galway and Kerry, who first played each other in 1913. It was considered to be one of the biggest rivalries in Gaelic games during the 1960s. Kerry's home ground is Fitzgerald Stadium and Galway's home ground is Pearse Stadium, however, all of their championship meetings have been held at neutral venues, usually Croke Park.

The teams are two of the most successful in the sport. Kerry have the most All-Ireland titles of any county, while Galway are the third most successful. At provincial level, Kerry have the highest number of Munster titles while Galway have the most Connacht titles.

Senior results

Championship

References

Kerry
Kerry county football team rivalries